Det sa klick! is a 2012 studio album by Elisa's.

Track listing

Contributors
Elisa Lindström – Vocals, trumpet
Markus Frykén  – guitar
Robert Lundh  – keyboards
Daniel Wallin – drums
Petter Ferneman  – bass, accordion

Charts

Weekly charts

Year-end charts

References 

Elisas, Det sa klick! (album lines), 2012

2012 albums
Elisa's albums
Swedish-language albums